was a Japanese kugyō during the Muromachi period.

He was the son of Tokudaiji Kin'ari.   His children were Tokudaiji Fusako (wife of Konoe Hisamichi and mother of Konoe Taneie and Koga Haremichi), Tokudaiji Kintane, Hino Uchimitsu and a wife of Koga Michinobu.

Biography 
On 29 August 1462, Saneatsu was made a jusanmi. From 1481 to 1485, he served as a naidaijin. He was promoted to juichii on 4 May 1485. He later served as the Minister of the Left from 1487 to 1493. Finally, from 1509 to 1511, he served as daijō-daijin. He died in 1533.

See also 
Kujō Masamoto

References 

1533 deaths
1445 births
People of Sengoku-period Japan
Tokudaiji family